The Munch Box is a children's cooking game show that aired on CITV from 5 October 2013 to 13 December 2014, hosted by Layla Anna-Lee with Ben Ebbrell for Series 1, and by Joe Hurd for Series 2.

Transmissions

External links

2010s British children's television series
2013 British television series debuts
2014 British television series endings
British children's game shows
English-language television shows
ITV Breakfast
ITV children's television shows
ITV (TV network) original programming